The Man Who Forgot is a 1927 silent Australian feature film which marked the directorial debut of A. R. Harwood. It is considered a lost film.

Production
Little is known about the movie apart from the fact it was a low-budget melodrama shot outdoors to save on studio costs. The story included scenes at the Ascot racecourse in Melbourne, a fight on the brink of the Werribee Gorge, timber felling in the Dandenong Rangers, and an escape by the hero in an aeroplane at the Essendon Aerodrome.

Release
Harwood distributed the film himself in partnership with his leading actors Nicholls and Hallam. They showed it on a double bill with Jewelled Nights (1925) around rural Victoria. Harwood, Nicholls and Hallam then announced plans to make a second feature together, a farce called Struth, but the project was abandoned and Harwood spent the next few years in distribution.

Cast
 William Hallam as Crazy Dan
 Walter Nicholls as Stephen Jackson

References

External links
 

1927 films
Lost Australian films
Australian silent feature films
Australian black-and-white films